The Historic Village of the Narragansetts in Charlestown is an historic district  in Charlestown, Rhode Island encompassing what were for nearly two centuries the reservation lands of the Narragansett people. These lands served as the Narragansett reservation between 1709 and 1880, when the tribe sold the land to the state and was formally detribalized. Because of this long period of Native occupation, the area is archaeologically important, containing both historic and prehistoric artifacts. The Narragansetts have since received federal recognition.

The district was listed on the National Register of Historic Places in 1973.

See also
National Register of Historic Places listings in Washington County, Rhode Island

References

Narragansett tribe
Historic districts in Washington County, Rhode Island
Charlestown, Rhode Island
Populated places in Washington County, Rhode Island
Historic districts on the National Register of Historic Places in Rhode Island
1973 establishments in Rhode Island